The Tekke of Martanesh or Peshku Teqe (Teqeja e Peshkut) is a Cultural Monument of Albania, located in Martanesh, Dibër County.

References

Cultural Monuments of Albania
Sufi tekkes in Albania
Bektashi Order
Buildings and structures in Dibër County